Sophia Brown may refer to:

Sophia Monique Brown, London-based actress, dancer and performance artist
Sophia Brown, 2009 Big Brother contestant